Seamedu School of Pro-Expressionism is a media school based in Pune, founded in 2008, which offers courses within the fields of media and entertainment. Seamedu provides degree and diploma courses in sub-domains like Filmmaking, Game Art, Design and Development, Visual Effects, Sound Engineering, Photography, Animation and Broadcast Journalism. The school has branches in Pune, Mumbai, Bengaluru and Chandigarh.

Courses
The institute offers specialized courses in game design, animation, sound engineering, filmmaking, photography, music production, mass communication and Broadcast Journalism.

Events
Seamedu Film Festival
Seamedu Game Meet
Seamedu Music Competition which is held online for a duration of a month

References

Journalism schools in Asia
Educational institutions established in 2008
Film schools in India
Universities and colleges in Pune
2008 establishments in Maharashtra